In the United States, bans on the Chinese social media platform TikTok—both on a state level and a national level—have been proposed. Throughout 2022 and 2023, a total of 32 states implemented bans on TikTok on government-issued devices, and several universities in the United States have implemented similar bans. As part of the Consolidated Appropriations Act, 2023, the United States federal government prohibits the use of TikTok on government-issued devices.

The federal government has reportedly considered banning TikTok if ByteDance, TikTok's parent company, does not sell the app.

References

TikTok
Access control
Internet censorship in the United States